The Monroe County Courthouse is the courthouse for Monroe County, Georgia in Forsyth, which was built in 1896.  It was designed by architects Bruce & Morgan, who also designed the similar Butts County Courthouse built two years later.  It was listed on the National Register of Historic Places in 1980.

The courtroom was called "one of the most impressive in Georgia" in its National Register nomination.

References

Courthouses on the National Register of Historic Places in Georgia (U.S. state)
Government buildings completed in 1896
County courthouses in Georgia (U.S. state)
National Register of Historic Places in Monroe County, Georgia